Saccharopolyspora hattusasensis is a bacterium from the genus Saccharopolyspora which has been isolated from soil from Sungurlu in Turkey.

References

Pseudonocardineae
Bacteria described in 2018